Paulus Manutius (1512–1574) was a Venetian printer with a humanist education, the third son of the famous printer Aldus Manutius and his wife Maria Torresano.

Life
As a young man, Paulus Manutius moved to Venice to get an education and was well received by his father's old friends Pietro Bembo, Ramberto, and Egnatio. During Paulus' education his grandfather, Andrea Torresani and two uncles, Frederick and Francesco, carried on the Aldine Press. Andrea Torresani died in October 1528 which brought disputes between Paulus and his uncles that halted the work of the press for four years. In 1533 Paulus assumed direction of his father's business. In that first year alone, the press issued eleven titles. From 1536 to 1539, Paulus was involved in a lawsuit against his uncles in an effort to reclaim his father's italic type. In 1539, Paulus won.

Paulus was a passionate Ciceronian, and perhaps his chief contributions to scholarship are the corrected editions of Cicero's letters and orations (Epistolae ad familiares in 1540, Epistolae ad Atticum and Epistolae ad Marcum Iunium Brutum et ad Quintum Ciceronem fratrem in 1547), his own epistles in a Ciceronian style, and his Latin version of Demosthenes' Philippics (Demosthenis orationes quattuor contra Philippum, 1549). Throughout his life he combined the occupations of a scholar and a printer. As a scholar he is remembered for four elegant Latin treatises on Roman antiquities. His correct editions of the classics,  printed in a splendid style, were highly esteemed, yet sales did not always support such productions; in 1556 he received for a time external support from the Venetian Academy founded by Federigo Badoaro. But Badoaro failed disgracefully in 1559, and the academy was extinct in 1562.

Meanwhile, Paulus had established his brother, Antonio in a printing office and book shop at Bologna. Antonio died in 1559, having been a source of trouble and expense to Paulus during the last four years of his life. Other pecuniary embarrassments arose from a contract for supplying fish to Venice, into which Paulus had somewhat strangely entered with the government.

In Rome
In 1561, Pope Pius IV invited him to Rome, offering him a yearly stipend of 500 ducats, and undertaking to establish and maintain his press there. The profits on publications were to be divided between Paulus Manuzio and the Papal Treasury. Paulus accepted the invitation, and spent the larger portion of his time, under three pontiffs, with varying fortunes, in the city of Rome. The Vatican was eager to make effective use of the press to counter the growing influence of Protestant publications from beyond the Alps and his Roman editions for the Stamperia del Popolo Romano were mostly Latin works of theology and Biblical or patristic literature. They included Reginald Pole's De Concilio and Reformatio Angliae (both 1562) and official publications from the Council of Trent such as the Canones et decreta (1564) the Index Librorum Prohibitorum (1564), the Catechismus (1566), and the Breviarium Romanum (1568).  Ill-health, the commercial interests he had left behind at Venice, and the lack of interest shown by Pope Pius V, left Paulus ready to travel back to Venice in 1570, having spent nine years in Rome.

Later years and death
On April 6, 1574, Paulus Manutius died at 61 and was buried at the Dominican Church of Rome.

See also
Aldus Manutius
Aldine Press
Aldus Manutius the Younger

Works
 In epistolas Ciceronis ad Atticum, 1546.
 Commentarius in epistolas M. Tullii Ciceronis ad M. Junium Brutum, et ad Q. Ciceronem Fratrem, 1557.
 
 Ciceronis in M. Antonium, 1572.
 In Ciceronis orationem pro Archia poeta commentarius, 1572.

References

 
 

1512 births
1574 deaths
Italian printers
Italian Renaissance humanists
Italian publishers (people)
Harold B. Lee Library-related rare books articles